The Bishop of Elphin is an episcopal title which takes its name after the village of Elphin, County Roscommon, Ireland. In the Roman Catholic Church it remains a separate title, but in the Church of Ireland it has been united with other bishoprics.

History
From the time Christianity first arrived in Ireland in the first half of the 5th century (in the form of Palladius's mission), the early church was centred around monastic settlements. Patrick founded such a settlement in an area known as Corcoghlan, now known as Elphin, in 434 or 435. Following the Synod of Rathbreasail in the year 1111, the Diocese of Elphin was formally established.

Following the Reformation of the 16th century and related turmoil, there were parallel apostolic successions.

In the Church of Ireland, the bishopric continued until 1841 when it combined with Kilmore and Ardagh to form the united bishopric of Kilmore, Elphin and Ardagh.

In the Roman Catholic Church, the title continues as a separate bishopric. The bishop's seat (cathedra) is located at the Cathedral Church of the Immaculate Conception in Sligo, Ireland. The current bishop, the Most Reverend Kevin Doran was appointed to the post by Pope Francis on 14 May 2014.

Pre-Reformation bishops

Post-Reformation bishops

Church of Ireland succession

Roman Catholic succession

Notes

References

 
  
 
 

Bishops of Elphin
Lists of Irish bishops and archbishops
 
 
Roman Catholic Diocese of Elphin
Religion in County Galway
Religion in County Roscommon
Religion in County Sligo